Castro Valley is a census-designated place (CDP) in Alameda County, California, United States. At the 2010 census, it was the fifth most populous unincorporated area in California and the twenty-third most populous in the United States. The population was 66,441 at the 2020 census.

Castro Valley is named after Don Guillermo Castro, a noted 19th-century Californio ranchero who owned the land where the community is located.

History

Before the arrival of European settlers the area was settled by the Chocheño (also spelled Chochenyo or Chocenyo) subdivision of the Ohlone Native Americans.

With the arrival of Europeans, they established Mission San Jose in 1797. The area Castro Valley now occupies was part of the extensive colony of New Spain in what was the province of Alta California.

Castro Valley was part of the original 28,000 acre (110 km) land grant given to Castro in 1840, called Rancho San Lorenzo. This land grant included Hayward, San Lorenzo, and Castro Valley, including Crow Canyon, Cull Canyon, and Palomares Canyons. Castro had a gambling habit and had to sell off portions of his land to pay gambling debts. The last of his holding was sold in a sheriff's sale in 1864 to Faxon Atherton for $400,000.

Atherton (after whom the city of Atherton is named) in turn began selling off his portion in smaller parcels. Two men named Cull (the namesake of Cull Canyon) and Luce bought some 2,400 acres (10 km) and began running a steam-operated saw mill in Redwood Canyon. The Jensen brothers also bought land from Atherton in 1867.

In 1866, Redwood school was built, the first public school in the area. Many Portuguese families immigrated to the surrounding canyons (especially Palomares Canyon) and farmed large amounts of land, where their descendants remain today. In the 1870s, Lake Chabot, a reservoir and popular park, was built by Chinese laborers living at Camp Yema-Po. 
During the 1940s and 1950s, Castro Valley was known for its chicken ranches. Later it developed into a bedroom community, where workers live and commute to their jobs in the surrounding communities.

Geography
Lake Chabot lies in the northwest part of Castro Valley. Directly to the west is San Leandro. Hayward is to the south. Dublin, Pleasanton, and San Ramon are to the east.

The eastern hills of Castro Valley constitute the headwaters of the San Lorenzo Creek watershed and the origin of several creeks that flow into San Lorenzo Creek: Bolinas, Castro Valley, Chabot, Crow, Cull, Eden, Hollis, Kelly Canyon, Norris, and Palomares Creeks.

Demographics

2010
At the 2010 census 61,388 people, 22,348 households, and 16,112 families resided in the CDP. The racial makeup of the CDP was 58.0% White (49.5% non-Hispanic), 6.9% African American (6.6% non-Hispanic), 0.5% Native American, 21.4% Asian, 0.7% Pacific Islander, 6.1% from other races, and 6.3% from two or more races. 17.4% of the population was Hispanic or Latino of any race.

The census reported that 98.0% of the population lived in households, 0.4% lived in non-institutionalized group quarters, and 1.5% were institutionalized.

Of the 22,348 households 36.1% had children under the age of 18 living in them, 54.3% were opposite-sex married couples living together, 12.6% had a female householder with no husband present, and 5.2% had a male householder with no wife present. 5.0% of households were unmarried opposite-sex partnerships and 1.0% were same-sex married couples or partnerships. 21.7% of households were one person and 8.9% were one person aged 65 or older. The average household size was 2.69 and the average family size was 3.15.

The age distribution was 23.4% under the age of 18, 7.6% aged 18 to 24, 24.5% aged 25 to 44, 31.1% aged 45 to 64, and 13.4% 65 or older. The median age was 41.2 years. For every 100 females, there were 94.5 males. For every 100 females age 18 and over, there were 91.0 males.

There were 23,392 housing units, of which 22,348 were occupied,  of which 69.0% were owner-occupied and 31.0% were occupied by renters. The homeowner vacancy rate was 1.3%; the rental vacancy rate was 5.4%. 68.8% of the population lived in owner-occupied housing units and 29.2% lived in rental housing units.

2000
At the 2000 census there were 57,292 people, 21,606 households, and 15,016 families in the CDP.
Of the 21,606 households 32.3% had children under the age of 18 living with them, 54.0% were married couples living together, 11.0% had a female householder with no husband present, and 30.5% were non-families. 23.2% of households were one person and 9.3% were one person aged 65 or older.  The average household size was 2.58 and the average family size was 3.05.

The age distribution was 23.7% under the age of 18, 6.8% from 18 to 24, 29.8% from 25 to 44, 25.0% from 45 to 64, and 14.7% 65 or older.  The median age was 39 years. For every 100 females, there were 94.6 males.  For every 100 females age 18 and over, there were 91.0 males.

The median household income was $76,197 and the median family income  was $91,713 as of a 2008 estimate. About 2.7% of families and 4.5% of the population were below the poverty line, including 4.3% of those under age 18 and 4.5% of those age 65 or over.

Economy
The economy of Castro Valley consists largely of the provision of goods and services for local residents. Being a primarily residential community, only about 5% of the area has been developed for commercial uses.

The greatest number of people (6,683) are employed by the health care and social assistance industry, followed by the retail trade industry with 1,073 employees and accommodation and food service with 1,044 employees. The health care and social assistance industry provided $1.1 billion in sales, shipments, receipts or revenue in 2012, which is the highest of all industries, and it is followed by the retail trade industry, which had a value of $324.1 million in sales, shipments, receipts or revenue.

The median household income of residents was $108,488 in 2019, compared to a median income of $99,406 for all of Alameda County. The poverty rate was 6.9%, compared to 8.6% in all of Alameda County.

Art and culture

Castro Valley is one of the sites where Joseph Eichler built some of the 10,000 or so homes he built in the Bay Area.
Castro Valley has a one-screen movie theater, the Chabot Cinema.
The Castro Village complex on Castro Valley Boulevard is widely considered the commercial center of town.
The Harry Rowell Rodeo Ranch is located in Castro Valley and is managed by the Hayward Area Recreation and Park District. Rodeos are held there regularly.

Historical landmarks and museums

First public school in Castro Valley

The first public school in Castro Valley is a designated California Historical Landmark. A plaque is placed at the original site. The one-room schoolhouse was donated for "educational purposes only," by Josiah Grover Brickell in 1866. Brickell provided the salary for the first teacher. During the day the teacher taught children and in the evening they taught farmhands. The school burned down in 1901. It was rebuilt and burned down again in 1920. A new school was built on another property.

Adobe Art Gallery
The Adobe Art Gallery is a program operated by the Hayward Area Recreation and Park District promoting the visual arts and uses the Adobe building, built as a Works Progress Administration project in 1936.

Law and government
Castro Valley is an unincorporated community and thus is governed directly by the County of Alameda. There is no city police force, with policing provided by the Alameda County Sheriff's Office and the California Highway Patrol. The town has fire protection provided by the Alameda County Fire Department. Castro Valley has its own sanitary district, as well as its own school district. Efforts to incorporate Castro Valley have been voted down by its residents at the polls in both 1956 and 2002.  Castro Valley is also represented by a seven-member Municipal Advisory Council, which is an advisory body appointed to advise the Alameda County Board of Supervisors on local issues.

Education
According to the 2015–2019 American Community Survey, educational attainment for Castro Valley residents at least 25 years old is 91.5% high school graduate and 44.9% bachelor's degree.

Public schools
Castro Valley is primarily served by the Castro Valley Unified School District, though portions of it are served by the Hayward Unified School District (South of I-580 and West of Grove Way) and the San Lorenzo Unified School District (westernmost part). Overall, the Castro Valley Unified School District serves almost 9,000 students.

The main high school is Castro Valley High School with over 3,000 students. Castro Valley also has Redwood High School, an alternative high school with approximately 193 students in 2005.
 Castro Valley has two public middle schools: Canyon Middle School and Creekside Middle School.
 Castro Valley has nine public elementary schools: Castro Valley, Chabot, Independent, Jensen Ranch, Marshall, Palomares, Proctor, Stanton, and Vannoy.

The school district includes the Castro Valley Adult School.

Private schools
There is also a Roman Catholic school, called Our Lady of Grace (K–8), which is part of the Roman Catholic Diocese of Oakland. Redwood Christian Schools has one elementary school (K–5) Redwood Christian Elementary.

Transportation

Interstate 580, which approaches from the east, makes a turn northward at Castro Valley. Interstate 238, which originates in Castro Valley, connects I-580 to Interstate 880.  In addition to being served by those two freeways, Castro Valley is served with public transportation by bus system AC Transit, and rapid transit system BART with a station.

The primary local east-west arterial road is Castro Valley Boulevard, while Lake Chabot Road, Redwood Road and Crow Canyon Road are the major north-south arterials.

Historically, Castro Valley Boulevard was part of the first transcontinental highway system, the Lincoln Highway.

Through BART, Castro Valley has links to all three of the San Francisco Bay Area's major commercial airports, though the closest by distance is Oakland International Airport.

Services 
Eden Medical Center operates in Castro Valley. It is a Sutter Health facility, and provides basic emergency medical services for the area.
Castro Valley Sanitary District runs wastewater treatment facilities, and was selected as California's best small wastewater system in 2002 and 2018.

Notable people

 Christopher Andersen, journalist, former editor of Time and People magazines, No. 1 New York Times bestselling author
 Mac Barnett, author
 Amy Berg, television writer and producer
 David Bingham, soccer player
 Mike Bordin, co-founder and drummer of Faith No More, as well as drummer for Black Sabbath, Korn and Ozzy Osbourne, attended Castro Valley High School
 Lilan Bowden, actress, comedian, and filmmaker. 
 Brodie Brazil, Emmy Award-winning reporter for Comcast SportsNet Bay Area/Comcast SportsNet California and San Jose Sharks sideline reporter
 Darren Brazil, editor for Comcast SportsNet Bay Area
 Cliff Burton (deceased), former bassist of Metallica, attended Castro Valley High School
 Jason Castro, Major League Baseball catcher for the Los Angeles Angels of Anaheim, born in Castro Valley
 Frank Cepollina, engineer
 Sarah Clatterbuck, computer engineer.
 Tim Davis, football coach
 Jack Del Rio, former head coach of NFL's Oakland Raiders, born in Castro Valley
 Val Diamond of Beach Blanket Babylon
 Garret Dillahunt, actor, No Country For Old Men, born in Castro Valley
 Craig Ferguson, Canadian ice hockey player
 Gregg Field, musician and producer
 Kyle Gass, musician, actor
 Mary Hayashi, Former California State Assembly Member
 Dean Heller, former U.S. Senator
 Sebastian Janikowski, Polish-born football placekicker for Oakland Raiders, current resident
 Brian Keyser, Major League Baseball player
 Kris LaPoint, professional water skier
 Nick Lima, professional soccer player, born in Castro Valley
 Luenell, actress and comedian
 Kevin Maas, Major League Baseball player
 Rachel Maddow, anchor and political analyst on MSNBC's The Rachel Maddow Show and The Rachel Maddow Show on Air America Radio.
 "Big" Jim Martin, former guitar player for Faith No More
 Alec Nevala-Lee, novelist and science-fiction writer
 Miranda Nild, soccer player for Thailand women's national team; born in Castro Valley
 Psyclon Nine, aggrotech and industrial metal group
 Ed Sprague Jr., Major League Baseball player, 2-time World Series champion; born in Castro Valley
 Jim and Jennifer Stolpa, whose story was featured in the film Snowbound: The Jim and Jennifer Stolpa Story
 Greg Tabor, Major League Baseball player
 Nick Terry (producer), Talent Manager & Producer
 Christopher Titus, comedian
 Casey Wellman, professional ice hockey player

References

External links

 
 Castro Valley Chamber of Commerce
 Castro Valley News  - Local News and Information
 Castro Valley Matters - Local Advocacy Group
 Castro Valley history
 Castro Valley Unified School District
 Friends of San Lorenzo Creek

Census-designated places in Alameda County, California
Valleys of California
Census-designated places in California
Valleys of Alameda County, California